City of Canberra may refer to:

 Canberra, the capital city of Australia
 City of Canberra, a Boeing 707 formerly operated by Qantas on display at the Qantas Founders Outback Museum in Longreach, Queensland
 City of Canberra (aircraft), a Boeing 747-400 formerly operated by Qantas on display at the Historical Aircraft Restoration Society museum at Illawarra Regional Airport, New South Wales
 Civic, Australian Capital Territory, the central business district of Canberra
 No. 28 Squadron RAAF, a squadron of the Royal Australian Air Force Reserve also known as No. 28 "City of Canberra" Squadron